The Litang–Qinzhou railway or Liqin railway, is a railroad in Guangxi Autonomous Region of China that branches off the Hunan–Guangxi railway in Heng County in central Guangxi, about 60 km south of Litang Township, and runs further south to the port city of Qinzhou, on the Gulf of Tonkin. Major cities and towns along route include Heng County, Lingshan County and Qinzhou.

Rail connections
 Litang: Hunan–Guangxi railway, Litang–Zhanjiang railway

See also
 List of railways in China

References

Railway lines in China
Rail transport in Guangxi
Railway lines opened in 1994